Nat's What I Reckon is an Australian YouTube channel featuring Nat, a Sydney-based stand-up comedian, mental health advocate, rock musician and social commentator.

The YouTube channel presents a mixture of content ranging from trade show reviews, cooking tutorials and social commentary, with Dave Grohl, Carl Cox and Yael Stone among the channel's fans. He has collaborated on his YouTube channel with Machine Gun Kelly, Mighty Car Mods and Briggs.

As of January 2022, the channel has over 395,000 subscribers and over 23.4 millions views.

In December 2020, Nat released a book titled Un-cook Yourself: A Ratbag's Rules for Life, which was awarded the Booktopia Favourite Australian Book Award for 2020.

History

Nat, who has chosen not to disclose his surname, grew up in Sydney, Australia. He describes his childhood as being "difficult" with periods of suffering from anxiety and depression. He attended the Hillsong Church where his father was a minister. He left the church while still a teenager and spent time backpacking throughout India.

He attended a Waldorf school before studying singing and guitar at a private college in Sydney.

The YouTube channel began in 2006 and featured regular videos titled "Is it shit?", where Nat would review a variety of topics and decide if the topic was worthwhile.

In 2016, Nat met his partner Julia Gee, known as Jules, via a dating app. She works as a graphic designer designing artwork for the YouTube channel and also films their videos.

In 2019, Nat was an ambassador for the UNSW Big Anxiety Festival.

In 2020, the channel began featuring healthy cooking segments when a stand-up comedy tour featuring Nat was cancelled due to COVID-19 lockdowns across Australia. Nat noticed supermarkets were low on stock for jar sauces while fresh produce remained on the shelves during panic buying due to the coronavirus pandemic.

Nat turned to healthy cooking and eating after having a lung removed due to complications from tuberculosis.

In September 2020, Growcom, a Queensland government–funded horticulture body, announced a partnership with Nat's What I Reckon as part of their Eat Yourself To Health campaign.

On December 6, 2020, Nat was the guest programmer on the Australian music video television show Rage.

In July 2021, Nat appeared on the ABC long-form interview television show One Plus One with Courtney Act.

In 2021, Nat released two organic wines with Nat's What I Reckon branding—named Reckon Roger & Ian's Boating Wine and Nat's What I Reckon Cheeky Redders Greenache—in a collaboration with Built To Spill and Dreaded Friend winery.

Nat is a musician with two Sydney-based bands, including as a singer and guitarist for Keggerdeth and drummer for the band Penalties.

Publications
 Un-cook Yourself: A Ratbag's Rules for Life 
 Death To Jar Sauce

References

External links
Nat's What I Reckon Official website
Nat's What I Reckon YouTube Channel

1980s births
21st-century Australian comedians
Australian male comedians
Australian male writers
Australian drummers
Australian rock musicians
Australian stand-up comedians
Australian YouTubers
Comedians from Sydney
Food and cooking YouTubers
Living people
Unidentified people
YouTube channels launched in 2006